In mathematics, the Fox derivative is an algebraic construction in the theory of free groups which bears many similarities to the conventional derivative of calculus. The Fox derivative and related concepts are often referred to as the Fox calculus, or (Fox's original term) the free differential calculus. The Fox derivative was developed in a series of five papers by mathematician Ralph Fox, published in Annals of Mathematics beginning in 1953.

Definition
If G is a free group with identity element e and generators gi, then the Fox derivative with respect to gi is a function from G into the integral group ring ZG which is denoted , and obeys the following axioms:
 , where  is the Kronecker delta
 
  for any elements u and v of G.
The first two axioms are identical to similar properties of the partial derivative of calculus, and the third is a modified version of the product rule. As a consequence of the axioms, we have the following formula for inverses
  for any element u of G.

Applications
The Fox derivative has applications in group cohomology, knot theory and covering space theory, among other areas of mathematics.

See also
 Alexander polynomial
 Free group
 Ring (mathematics)
 Integral domain

References
 

Geometric topology
Combinatorial group theory